Bavayia cyclura, also known as Günther's New Caledonian gecko or the forest bavayia is a gecko endemic to Grande Terre and Ile des Pins including their neighboring islets in  New Caledonia.

References

Bavayia
Reptiles described in 1872
Taxa named by Albert Günther
Geckos of New Caledonia